The 2009–10 Hellenic Football League season was the 57th in the history of the Hellenic Football League, a football competition in England.

Premier Division

Premier Division featured 18 clubs which competed in the division last season, along with four new clubs:
Ascot United, promoted from Division One East
Binfield, promoted from Division One East
Malmesbury Victoria, promoted from Division One West
Oxford City Nomads, promoted from Division One West

League table

Division One East

Division One East featured 14 clubs which competed in the division last season, along with four clubs:
Chalfont Wasps, demoted from the Premier Division
Didcot Town reserves
Milton United, relegated from the Premier Division
Woodley Town, joined from the Reading Football League

Also, Bisley changed name to Farnborough reserves.

League table

Division One West

Division One West featured 13 clubs which competed in the division last season, along with four new clubs:
Harrow Hill, relegated from the Premier Division
Launton Sports, transferred from Division One East
North Leigh reserves
Slimbridge, joined from the Gloucestershire County League

League table

References

External links
 Hellenic Football League

2009-10
9